The 2009 Porsche Carrera Cup Great Britain was the seventh Porsche Carrera Cup Great Britain season. The season consisted of twenty rounds, beginning on 5 April at Brands Hatch's Indy circuit and ending on 4 October at the circuit's Grand Prix layout. The series supported the British Touring Car Championship throughout the season. Tim Bridgman took his first title, holding off the challenges of reigning champion Tim Harvey, James Sutton and Michael Caine. In the other classes, Glynn Geddie took home the Pro-Am 1 title, while Glenn McMenamin won Pro-Am 2.

Entry list
 All drivers raced in Porsche 911 GT3s. Guest drivers in italics.

Calendar
All races were held in the United Kingdom.

Driver's Standings

References

External links
 Porsche Carrera Cup Great Britain

Porsche Carrera Cup GB
Porsche Carrera Cup Great Britain seasons